Laura Veltz is a Grammy-nominated American songwriter and musician. She previously was the vocalist and multi-instrumentalist of family pop-rock group Cecilia. She was nominated for the first ever Grammy Award for Songwriter of the Year at the 65th Annual Grammy Awards for her work on releases by Maren Morris, Demi Lovato and Ingrid Andress.

Early life and career
Laura Veltz started her music career as a vocalist and multi-instrumentalist of her family pop-rock group Cecilia in 1996 to 2006. After the group split up, in 2008, she moved to Nashville, Tennessee to pursue her career as a songwriter, lured by Kye Fleming and Mark D. Sanders. She started her songwriting career in Nashville by writing with country music group Edens Edge on their debut self-titled album.

In 2020, Veltz was nominated for her first Grammy Award in the category of Best Country Song for writing Dan + Shay's "Speechless".

Songwriting discography

Awards and nominations

Grammy Awards

Academy of Country Music Awards

Country Music Association Awards

References

Living people
American country singer-songwriters
American women singer-songwriters
Singer-songwriters from Tennessee
Year of birth missing (living people)